This is a list of brand name confectionery products. Sugar confectionery includes candies (sweets in British English), candied nuts, chocolates, chewing gum, bubble gum, pastillage, and other confections that are made primarily of sugar. In some cases, chocolate confections (confections made of chocolate) are treated as a separate category, as are sugar-free versions of sugar confections. The words candy (US and Canada), sweets (UK and Ireland), and lollies (Australia and New Zealand) are common words for the most common varieties of sugar confectionery.

Confectionery brands

A 
 Allen's 
 Minties
 Fantales 
 Anthon Berg
Alfredo
 Arcor
 Almond Joy

B 

 Bamsemums
 Banjo
 Barambo
 Barratt
 Black Jacks
Dib dabs
 Dolly Mixture
 Flumps
 Fruit salad
 Refreshers (compressed tablet, see also Swizzels Matlow Refreshers)
 Sherbet Fountain
 Bassett's
 Jelly Babies
 Liquorice allsorts
 Bazooka (gum)
 Bebeto
 Bonbon
 Brach's
 Brittle
 Bulls-eyes

C 

 Cadbury
 Amazin' Raisin – a British chocolate-covered raisin product produced by Cadbury in the 1970s
 Bubblicious
 Creme egg
 Cherry Ripe
 Crunchie
 Curly Wurly
 Dairy Milk
 Eclairs
 Flake
 Freddo
 Freshen Up Gum
 Picnic
 Pyramint – a short-lived British candy produced in the 1980s by Cadbury that consisted of a chocolate pyramid with a mint-flavored filling
 Roses
 Starbar
 Twirl
 Wispa
 Candy Buttons
 Campino
 Chewits
 Choco Treasure
 Chocolaterie Stam

D 

 Daim bar
 Darrell Lea
 Dubble Bubble
 Dum Dums
 Dove Chocolate

E 
 Everton mints

F 
 Farrah's Harrogate toffee

 Ferrero
 Rocher
 Kinder Bueno
 Kinder Egg
 Lemonhead
 Mon Chéri
 Nutella
 Raffaello
 Tic Tac
 Ferrara 
 100 Grand Bar
 Chunky
 Atomic Sour Balls
 Baby Ruth             
 Bobs Candies
 Butterfinger
 Chuckles
 Fruit Stripe
 Great Bite
 Jujyfruits
 Fini
 Camel Balls-Bubblegum
 Liquorice Wondermix
 Rainbow Pencils
 Smooth Strawberry Pencils
 Fisherman's Friend
 Flying Saucers
 FruChocs

G 
 Ganong Bros.
 Glico
 Godiva
 Goldenberg's Peanut Chews
 Grether's Pastilles
 Gummy bears

H 

 
 Haribo
 Haviland Thin Mints
 Hershey's
 5th Avenue
 Almond Joy
 Good & Fruity
 Good & Plenty
 Heath Bar
 Hershey bar
 Ice Breakers
 Jolly Rancher
 Kisses
 Krackel
 Milk Duds
 Mounds
 Mr. Goodbar
 PayDay
 Reese's Pieces
 Reese's Peanut Butter Cups
 Rolo
 Skor
 Take 5
 Twizzlers
 Whatchamacallit
 Whoppers
 York Peppermint Pattie
 Zero
 Hippy Sippy
 Hopje
 Hot Tamales
 Humbugs

I 

 Ipso
 Idaho Spud

K 
 K Bar
 Kino
 Kit Kat
 Knoppers
 Konti Group
 Kopiko

L 
 Lindt & Sprüngli
 Ghirardelli Chocolate Company
 Lindor
 Russell Stover Candies

M 

Mars
 3 Musketeers
 Bounty
 Dove
 Galaxy
 Maltesers
 Mars Bar
 M&M's
 Milky way
 Pacers/Opal Mints
 Revels
 Snickers
 Starburst/Opal fruits
 Twix
 Wrigley's
 Chewing gum
 Doublemint
 Hubba Bubba
 Life Savers
 Lockets
 Skittles
 Maynards
 Sports Mixture
 Wine gum
 Maynards Wine Gums Light
 Maynards Wine Sours
 McCowan's
 McCowan's Toffee
 Meiji
 Mike and Ike
 Milkfuls
 Mr. Tom

N 

 
 Necco Wafers
 Nerds
 Nestle
After Eight
Aero
Crunch – several varieties, in addition to the original product, have been manufactured; in 1994, Crunch was their best-selling candy bar
 Bottle Caps
 Goobers
 Fun Dip
 Kit Kat
 Matchmakers
 Munchies
 Mintola
 Pixy Stix
 Polos
 Rolo
 Runts
 Quality Street
 Yorkie 
 Nik-L-Nip
 Neapolitans
 Now and Later

O 
 Orion

P 
 Page & Shaw
 Panda
 Pantteri
 Paynes Poppets
 Peach Rings
 Peeps
 Perfetti Van Melle
 Air Heads
 Chupa Chups
 Fruittella
 Klene
 Mentos
 Pez
 Pixy Stix
 Pop Rocks

Q

R 
 
 Rain-Blo
 Raisinets
 Razzles
 Redskins
 Reese's Whipps
 Riesen
 Ring Pop
 Rock (US)
 Rock (UK)
 Roshen
 Rowntree's 
 Cabana – a "short-lived chocolate bar" produced in the 1980s by Rowntree's
 Fruit gums
 Fruit pastilles
 Randoms

S 

 Sixlets
 Snickers
 Space Dust
 Spangles
 Spira
 Sports Mixture
 Starbar
 Starburst
 Sugar Daddy
 Sugus
 Super Bubble
 Swedish berries
 Swedish Fish
 Sweethearts
Swizzels Matlow
Double dip
Drumstick
 Love Hearts
 Parma Violets
 Rainbow Drops
 Refreshers

T 

Tangerine Confectionery
Mojo
Highland Toffee
 Wham Bar
 Tart 'n' Tinys
 Terry's
 Terry's Chocolate Orange
 Texan
 Thorntons
 Toblerone
 Toffifee
 Tony's Chocolonely
 Tootsie Roll Industries
 Andes Chocolate Mints
 Caramel Apple Pops
 Cella's
 Charleston Chew
 Charms Blow Pops
 Crows
 Cry Baby
 Dots
 Dubble Bubble
 Fluffy Stuff
 Frooties
 Junior Mints
 Tootsie Pop
 Tootsie Roll
 Topic
 Toxic Waste
 Trebor
 Extra Strong Mints
 Trebor Extra Cool Sugar Free
 Trebor Mini Softmints
 Treets
 Trio
 Trolli
 Tunes
 Turkish Taffy
 Twangers
 Twinkies
 Twizzlers

U 
 Ummah Foods
 Uncle Joe's Mint Balls
 Ülker

V 

 Victory V (lozenge)
 Vimto
 Violet Crumble
 Volcano Rocks

W 

 Whittakers
 Wacky Wafers
 Walkers toffee – one of the oldest toffee makers in England
Walkers Chocolates UK
 Walnut whip
 Wawel Royal
 Wax lips
 Whistle Pops
 Whitworths
 Wizz Fizz
 Wonder Ball
 Warheads
Whoppers

Z 
 Zours

See also

 List of bean-to-bar chocolate manufacturers
 List of breath mints
 List of candies
 List of chewing gum brands
 List of chocolate bar brands

References

External links
 

Confectionery brands
Lists of foods by type
 
Dessert-related lists